Senta-Sofia Delliponti (born 16 April 1990 in Wolfsburg, Germany) is a German singer, songwriter and actress. Since January 2014, she used the stage name Oonagh, until she changed it to Senta in 2022. Her signature musical style is inspired by the mystical lore of J. R. R. Tolkien's universe and by ethnic sounds throughout the world.

Biography

Early life and education
Senta-Sofia Delliponti was born on 16 April 1990, in Wolfsburg, Germany, to Maik Delliponti and Elena Delliponti. Her father is Italian and a pizza maker, and her mother is Bulgarian and a music teacher. She was named after the actress Senta Berger and the capital of her mother's home country, Sofia. She grew up in Gifhorn, Lower Saxony and has a younger brother. At the age of 13, Delliponti made her first appearance on the casting show Star Search, during which she took second place in the category Music Act from 10 to 15 years. With other candidates on the show, she released the single Smile, which made it to fifth place in the German music charts. She released a second single entitled Mother with the winner of Star Search, Daniel Siegert, although it only made it to number 71 in the charts. She appeared with Daniel Siegert on Die Schlager des Jahres 2003 (a compilation of hits of 2003). She also sang one track on a Christmas album released by TV Allstars. After completing her secondary school diploma in 2006, Delliponti was trained in acting and vocals at the Charlottenburg Acting School in Berlin from 2007 until 2010.

Career

On 12 July 2003, Delliponti made her first appearance on the talent show  on Sat.1. She participated in the category Music Act of 10 to 15 years and was able to prevail until the finale. Behind her associate act Daniel Siegert, she finished second on 10 August 2003.

Discography

Albums

Singles
"Scheißegal" (2006)
"Ich sehe was, was du nicht siehst" (2007) – Theme song for German series of Big Brother
"Gäa" (2014)
"Kuliko Jana – Eine neue Zeit" (2019)

Tours
 Mit den Gezeiten Tour 2014 (2014)
 Oonagh Tour 2015 (2015)
 Oonagh Tour 2017 (2017)

External links
 Oonagh – Universal Music Group

References

1990 births
Living people
English-language singers from Germany
People from Wolfsburg
Senta-Sofia Delliponti
German women singer-songwriters
German people of Bulgarian descent
German people of Italian descent
21st-century German women singers